Bogdan Pikuta (born 12 August 1972) is a retired Polish football striker.

References

1972 births
Living people
Polish footballers
Górnik Zabrze players
GKS Katowice players
Stal Stalowa Wola players
Widzew Łódź players
Raków Częstochowa players
KSZO Ostrowiec Świętokrzyski players
Zagłębie Sosnowiec players
Victoria Jaworzno players
Association football forwards